Varanasi district is a district in the north Indian state of Uttar Pradesh, with the holy city of Varanasi as the district headquarters. It is also the headquarters of the Varanasi Division which contains 4 districts (including Varanasi).

It is surrounded by Mirzapur district, Jaunpur district, Ghazipur district, Chandauli district, and Bhadohi district. The Ganga (Ganges) river flows through the district.

Divisions
The district is made up of three tehsils: Varanasi, Pindra,and Rajatalab, and eight Vidhan Sabha (Legislative Assembly) constituencies: Pindra, Shivpur, Rohaniya, Varanasi North, Varanasi South, Varanasi Cantt., Sevapuri, and Ajagara.

Demographics

According to the 2011 census, Varanasi district has a population of 3,676,841, This gives it a ranking of 75th in India (out of a total of 640). Its population growth rate over the decade 2001-2011 was 17.32%. Varanasi has a sex ratio of 909 females for every 1000 males, and a literacy rate of 77.05%. Scheduled Castes and Scheduled Tribes made up 13.24% and 0.78% of the population respectively.

Languages

At the time of the 2011 Census of India, 76.19% of the population spoke Hindi, 19.68% Bhojpuri, and 3.24% Urdu as their first language. Bhojpuri is the native language of Varanasi, however it is seen as a dialect of Hindi, therefore number of Bojpuri speakers are conflated with Hindi.

Education

Colleges/Institutes
Indian Institute of Technology (BHU)
International Rice Research Institute
National Institute of Fashion Technology (Rae Bareli Extension)
National School of Drama
Sunbeam College for Women
Institute of Medical Sciences - BHU
Indian Institute of Vegetable Research
Kashi Institute of Technology (KIT)
National Seed Research and Training Centre
Uday Pratap College

Universities
Banaras Hindu University
Central Institute of Higher Tibetan Studies
Jamia Salafia, Varanasi (The Salafi University Of India)
Mahatma Gandhi Kashi Vidyapith
Sampurnanand Sanskrit Vishwavidyalaya

References

External links

 

 
Districts of Uttar Pradesh